Mariya Karpovna Bayda (February 1, 1922 – August 30, 2002) was a medical orderly in the 514th Infantry Regiment during World War II who fought in Crimea. When she was surrounded by Wehrmacht submachine gunners, she fought a heated gun battle against them, killing fifteen, wounding several more, and routing the rest, escaping wounded. For her wartime exploits, Bayda was awarded the honorary title of Hero of the Soviet Union in 1942.

Early life
Bayda was born in 1922 to a Russian family in the Krasnoperekopsk Raion of Crimea. After her parents died when she was young she was raised by her grandparents. In 1936, she dropped out of the school in Dzankoy without completing her studies. She worked on a state run farm, in a hospital, and then in a cooperative society in of the village of Voinka. After the house she lived in was bombed she began working at a train station to help civilians evacuate the city.

Military career 
In 1941, she joined the Red Army and was assigned as a nurse in the 3rd Battalion of 514th Rifle Regiment, 172nd Rifle Division of the Red Army of the North Caucasian front; she held the rank of senior sergeant and was deployed to the front lines that same year. In addition to providing first aid she dug trenches and captured German soldiers to be interrogated. In the autumn of 1941 she was transferred to a naval infantry battalion. Due to the unit's inadequate weaponry the Germans managed to takeover a hill they had been defending, but after orders from the company commander they managed to retake control. After the regiment was later withdrawn Bayda was reassigned to the medical division of a reconnaissance unit.

On 7 June 1942 she earned the nickname "fearless Marusia" after she killed 16 enemy combatants, one of whom was an officer, with her submachine gun and attacked four more German soldiers by hitting them on the head with the butt of her rifle in order to rescue her commander and eight other soldiers who were captured by the Germans. For her actions that day she was awarded the title Hero of the Soviet Union on 20 June 1942.

On 12 July 1942, after being severely wounded in battle, Bayda was taken prisoner and sent to Slavuta concentration camp in Ukraine and later Ravensbruck after she was held in Simferopol. She was released from captivity by the American forces on 8 May 1945.

Later life 
After the war, she was discharged from military service. For many years, she headed the Sevastopol city department of civil registration, and she was repeatedly selected the deputy of city council. In 1976, she was recognized as an Honourable Citizen of Sevastopol.

Awards
 Hero of the Soviet Union (20 June 1942)
 Order of Lenin (20 June 1942)
 Order of the Patriotic War 1st class (11 March 1985)
 campaign and jubilee medals

See also

 List of female Heroes of the Soviet Union
 Yekaterina Mikhailova-Demina
 Vera Kashcheyeva

References

Bibliography
 
 

1922 births
2002 deaths
Heroes of the Soviet Union
Recipients of the Order of Lenin
Ravensbrück concentration camp survivors
Soviet military personnel of World War II
Soviet prisoners of war
Women in the Russian and Soviet military
Russian women in World War II
Recipients of the Order of Bohdan Khmelnytsky, 2nd class